Proussy is a former commune in the Calvados department in the Normandy region in northwestern France. On 1 January 2016, it was merged into the new commune of Condé-en-Normandie.

In August 1944 as World War II was being fought, Proussy served as the location of Field Marshal Bernard Law Montgomery's tactical headquarters.

Population

References

Former communes of Calvados (department)
Calvados communes articles needing translation from French Wikipedia